Nationwide Fountain is a fountain designed by sculptor Jim Ponter and architect Don Olson in downtown Columbus, Ohio, United States. It is located at Nationwide Plaza, a complex of buildings including One Nationwide Plaza, and within Dean Jeffers Park. The abstract fountain features stacked geometric blocks of stone and bronze sculptures of various animals, including a frog, lizard, and salmon. 

The fountain was surveyed by the Smithsonian Institution's "Save Outdoor Sculpture!" program in 1994.

References

Abstract sculptures in the United States
Bronze sculptures in Ohio
Downtown Columbus, Ohio
Fish in art
Fountains in Ohio
Frogs in art
Lizards in art
Outdoor sculptures in Ohio
Stone sculptures in the United States